Solar power in Delaware is small industry. Delaware had 150 MW of total installed capacity in 2020. The largest solar farms in the state included the 10 MW Dover Sun Park and the 12 MW Milford Solar Farm.  

The expansion of Bruce A. Henry Solar Farm near Georgetown in Sussex County from 23 to 40 acres was completed in 2020. 

In a 2012 study, a typical 5 kW system will pay for itself in five years, and go on to provide a savings of $37,837 over the balance of its 25-year life. It is estimated that 19% of all electricity use in Delaware can be provided by rooftop solar panels. The state's renewable portfolio standard requires 0.4% from solar in 2012, 0.6% in 2013, 3.5% from solar by 2025, and 25% from renewable sources. 

Net metering is available for residential customers up to 25 kW and others from 100 kW to 2 MW depending on type of customer and the utility. Excess generation is credited at retail rate to next month's bill and optionally paid once a year at energy supply rate (normally referred to as "avoided cost").

Installed capacity

References

External links
Incentives and Policies

Delaware
Energy in Delaware